Desmognathus is a genus of lungless salamanders in the family Plethodontidae known as dusky salamanders. They range from Texas to the eastern United States and to south-eastern Canada.

Characteristics 
Species of the genus Desmognathus have a unique jaw-opening mechanism where the lower jaw is stationary and the skull swings open. There are additional stalked condyles, an atlanto-mandibular ligament, along with other skeletal and musculature features that have evolved to accompany this type of jaw-opening mechanism. Additionally, they are known to exhibit maternal care by brooding over their eggs.

Species
This genus includes the following 30-31 species:

References

External links
 Tree of Life: Desmognathus

Further reading
Baird SF. 1850. Revision of the North American Tailed-Batrachia, with descriptions of new genera and species. J. Acad. Nat. Sci. Philadelphia, Series 2, 1: 281–294. (Desmognathus, new genus, p. 282).

 
Amphibian genera
Amphibians of North America
Taxa named by Spencer Fullerton Baird